The 1899 Wisconsin Badgers football team represented the University of Wisconsin in the 1899 college football season. Led by fourth-year head coach Philip King, the Badgers compiled an overall record of 9–2 with a mark of 4–1 in conference play, placing second in the Western Conference. The team's captain was Pat O'Dea.

Schedule

References

Wisconsin
Wisconsin Badgers football seasons
Wisconsin Badgers football